José Ezekiel Misa Madrid (born December 4, 1997), professionally known as Ruru Madrid, is a Filipino actor, singer, model, host and vlogger who rose to fame in Protégé. He is known for portraying the role of Ybarro / Ybrahim in the 2016 version of Encantadia and the titular role of Lolong in a 2022 series with the same title.

Personal life
Madrid is a member of Iglesia ni Cristo. He finished high school at National Christian Life College in Marikina.

He has two siblings: Rara and actress Rere.

He was previously involved in a relationship with Gabbi Garcia.

In 2022, Madrid confirmed that he has been dating actress Bianca Umali for four years.

Career

At the age of 15, Madrid was nominated at the 2014 Singapore International Film Festival for Best Actor. His most recent awards were from PMPC Star Awards For Television: Best Drama Actor for Encantadia (2016) in 2017 and Best Single Performance By An Actor for an episode of Magpakailanman in 2018.

Discography

Filmography

Accolades

References

External links

Sparkle profile

1997 births
Living people
People from Zamboanga City
Visayan people
Members of Iglesia ni Cristo
21st-century Filipino male actors
Filipino male television actors
Filipino male models
Filipino television personalities
Participants in Philippine reality television series
Protégé (TV series) participants
GMA Network personalities
GMA Music artists
Filipino television variety show hosts